Beaufort Inlet also locally known as Pallinup Estuary is an inlet located in the Great Southern region of Western Australia about  east of Albany. 

The inlet functions mostly as a result of wave energy and is a wave dominated estuary.
The estuary is in a highly modified condition as a result of substantial clearing within the catchment and is eutrophied and prone to fish kills.

References 

Great Southern (Western Australia)
Inlets of Western Australia
South coast of Western Australia